Open House is an American sitcom that aired Sunday at 9:30 on Fox from August 27, 1989 to April 8, 1990. The series was a spin-off of the Fox series Duet.

Synopsis
Open House starred Alison LaPlaca as Linda Phillips, the former studio executive who brought the same zeal pushing costly houses for Juan Verde Real Estate as she did working at World Wide Studios. The series also starred Mary Page Keller and Chris Lemmon continuing their roles as Laura Kelly and Richard Phillips. Newly separated from her writer husband Ben Coleman, Laura also quit catering, and became an apprentice agent. Richard, Linda's husband, was a pianist at Jasper's, but left the hangout — and his wife — by mid-season. Among Linda's eccentric co-workers were Ted Nichols (Philip Charles MacKenzie), her main rival; Scott Babylon (Danny Gans), a talented impressionist; Margo Van Meter (Ellen DeGeneres), the sassy, man-hungry secretary; and Roger McSwain (Nick Tate), the manager of Juan Verde.

The premise of the series had originated in the series finale of Duet, in which Linda was introduced to Ted, who brought her to Juan Verde to start her new career. LaPlaca and MacKenzie had been dating for several years by the time they worked opposite each other on Duet and Open House (they first worked together on a 1985 episode of MacKenzie's former series, Brothers). In 1992, two years after the cancellation of Open House, LaPlaca and MacKenzie were married.

Cast

Episode list

External links
 
 

1989 American television series debuts
1990 American television series endings
1980s American sitcoms
1990s American sitcoms
American television spin-offs
English-language television shows
Fox Broadcasting Company original programming
Television series by CBS Studios
Television shows set in Los Angeles